The Dudley Spencer House, also called Laurel, is a Frank Lloyd Wright designed Usonian home in Wilmington, Delaware.

Wright designed this home in 1956 and named it "Laurel". This house is of the hemicycle design, and is built of irregularly coursed fieldstone. This single story house has a flat roof with curvilinear extensions and windows under roof extensions. The interior fireplace and hearth serves as dominant structural and aesthetic element. Typical of Wright designs, the home successfully blends with the surrounding wooded environment. The Dudley Spencer house is private and not accessible to the public.  The house was built by its first owner, Dudley Spencer, over a five-year period between 1956 and 1961.

Following the death of Spencer in 2012, the house was sold to its current owners in 2013.

The house was listed on the National Register of Historic Places in 1974.

See also
 National Register of Historic Places listings in Wilmington, Delaware

References

Further reading
 Storrer, William Allin. The Frank Lloyd Wright Companion. University Of Chicago Press, 2006,  (S.402)

External links
 S.402 Dudley Spencer Residence on Flickr - Photo Sharing!
 

Frank Lloyd Wright buildings
Houses on the National Register of Historic Places in Delaware
Houses in Wilmington, Delaware
National Register of Historic Places in Wilmington, Delaware